is one of several hot springs in the Akinomiya Hot Springs area of the city of Yuzawa,  in southern Akita Prefecture. The onsen is nestled in a small gorge along the banks of the Yakunai River. Because of its secluded location, it is referred to as a Hitou, or hidden hot spring.

History
Legend has it that the Akinomiya Hot Springs, the oldest in Akita Prefecture, were found 1,200 years ago. Local legend also has it that Takanoyu, or Falcon's Hot Spring, got its name when a falcon led a hunter to the spring, giving the onsen its eponymous name. The onsens in Akinomiya were officially recognized by the Akita Clan in the Edo period (1603–1868).

Water quality
The various hot springs in the immediate area are referred to as the Akinomiya Geothermal Area and are situated along the western base of Mount Kurikoma.

Takanoyu Onsen has its own hot spring, which emerges on the east bank of the Yakunai River. The water temperature at the spring source is 72 °C (162 °F). Only about ten percent of all hot spring facilities in Japan have water flowing directly from their own pure source. Its medicinal benefits are recommended for neuralgia, rheumatism, and skin disorders.

Baths
Takanoyu has indoor baths, or ofuro (お風呂), outdoor baths, or rotenburo (露天風呂), and a foot bath, or ashiyu (足湯). There are three, mixed bathing indoor baths of varying temperature, one of which a person can soak standing up in water 130 cm deep, and a women's bath. There are three mixed bathing rotenburo, one of which is located on the bank of the Yakunai River, and a women's rotenburo.

Onsen culture
Besides soaking in a spring fed ofuro, onsen provide an opportunity to experience traditional Japanese culture, including the Japanese love of nature. Many hot springs are located in rural mountainous areas. In Akita Prefecture, the inns typically serve sansai, or local wild vegetables, wild and cultivated mushrooms, and grilled mountain stream trout for dinner, and onsen tamago for breakfast.

Transportation

Akinomiya is located on highway route 108 approximately 30 minutes by car south from Yokobori, Akita, or 45 minutes by car north from Naruko, Miyagi.

Akinomiya and southern Akita Prefecture are also accessible by rail. Yokobori Station is served by the JR East Ōu Main Line serving Aomori, Akita, Yamagata, and Fukushima Prefectures. From Tokyo, southern Akita is served by the Tohoku Shinkansen (Furukawa Station) or the Yamagata Shinkansen (Shinjo Station).

References

External links
 Yuzawa City, Akita Tourist Brochure
 Akita Prefectural Guide Hot Springs
 List of Akita Hitou
 Akinomiya Hot Spring Resort on Google Maps
 Dong-a Ilbo travelogue review

Hot springs of Japan
Landforms of Akita Prefecture
Yuzawa, Akita
Tourist attractions in Akita Prefecture